Franklin Smoke (24 August 1860 – 27 February 1937) was a Conservative member of the House of Commons of Canada. He was born in South Dumfries Township, Canada West and became a barrister.

Smoke attended public and secondary schools at Paris, Ontario then proceeded to studies at Osgoode Hall Law School. In 1908, he was appointed King's Counsel.

In the 1919 Ontario election, Smoke was an unsuccessful candidate for provincial office. His campaign for federal office in the 1925 general election was successful, winning a Parliament seat at Brant riding. He was re-elected in 1926 and 1930 then defeated by George Wood of the Liberal party in the 1935 election.

Electoral record

References

External links
 

1860 births
1937 deaths
Canadian King's Counsel
Conservative Party of Canada (1867–1942) MPs
Members of the House of Commons of Canada from Ontario
Osgoode Hall Law School alumni
People from the County of Brant